Puerto Aguirre is an important inland riverport in Bolivia near the border
with Brazil. It is privately held by Central Aguirre Ltd. It is part of the 
municipality of Puerto Quijarro. It is connected via the Tamengo Canal to the
Paraguay/Parana waterway.

History
The port was inaugurated on September 11, 1988 by 
Joaquin Aguirre Lavayèn. In 2005 a new container facility was built at the port.
The port is a free trade zone.

News Stories 
https://web.archive.org/web/20140813161909/http://diarioaysen.cl/regional/puerto-aguirre-regularizar-500-viviendas-es-la-meta-del-municipio/

Ports and harbours of Bolivia
Populated places in Santa Cruz Department (Bolivia)